The Gloucester by-election was held on 12 September 1957.  It was held due to the death of the incumbent Labour MP, Moss Turner-Samuels.  The by-election was won by the Labour candidate Jack Diamond.

References

External links

Television footage of the campaign (British Film Institute)

By-elections to the Parliament of the United Kingdom in Gloucestershire constituencies
Gloucester by-election
20th century in Gloucestershire
Gloucester by-election
Gloucester by-election